Nappily Ever After is a 2018 American romantic comedy film directed by Haifaa al-Mansour and written by Adam Brooks and Cee Marcellus. It is based on the novel of the same name by Trisha R. Thomas. The film stars Sanaa Lathan, Ernie Hudson, Lyriq Bent, Lynn Whitfield, Ricky Whittle, and Camille Guaty.

The film was released on September 21, 2018, by Netflix.

Plot

Violet's (Sanaa Lathan) mother Paulette (Lynn Whitfield) always insists she look perfect. Paulette straightens her natural hair, but it takes time and she is occasionally burned by the iron. At a pool, a boy dares Violet to hold her breath longer underwater, so she jumps in, despite her mother's protests. Underwater, her hair instantly becomes naturally wild and frizzy. The other children start to tease her and call her chia pet, and her horrified mother takes her home.

As an adult, Violet is seemingly perfect: a successful advertising executive, has had her doctor boyfriend Clint (Ricky Whittle) for two years, and wears her hair long and straight (with great effort).

Her relationship with her mother continues to be close as she helps keep Violet the vision of perfection. She and Violet's father (Ernie Hudson) recently became estranged after he quit his job and became a model.

Violet expects Clint to propose on her birthday. After she accidentally gets sprayed by a neighbor’s kids, she urgently visits a hairdresser. The salonist's daughter erroneously causes some of Violet’s hair to fall out using relaxer. Causing a scene, Violet insults her afro as she was partly responsible for the incident, and then gets a weave.

At her birthday dinner, Clint gives Violet a dog instead of a ring, so she is very disappointed and confronts him later at home. He says she's always perfect and he doesn't really know her, including her favorite things. He also adds that being with her is like being on a two year first date. Violet breaks up with him, and he leaves.

As Violet goes shopping she notices Zoe shoplifting and drags her out of the store but gets stopped by a security guard. Zoe’s dad Will comes and is furious over what Zoe is doing but Violet thinks there is something wrong. Will says how would she tell him how to raise his child and they leave. An African American blonde woman goes into the mall with her boyfriend giving Violet an idea.

One night, Violet bleaches her hair blonde despite her friends thinking it's not her but still goes out with them to the club, and starts drinking. As she gets drunk, she goes home with a man. Thinking she's wild, they start foreplay, but they hit heads, leaving him bleeding. Violet leaves him and it rains so her hair starts to frizz and goes to see Clint at the hospital, only to find him with a new woman. Devastated, she goes home and gets drunk. Then she cries in the mirror and shaves her head. The next morning, Violet is horrified with what she has done. Wearing a scarf on her head, she cries in the bathroom at work. A woman there suggests she come to her support group, which she later discovers is for cancer survivors. Violet apologizes, but the group leader gives her words of support.

Over time, Violet grows confident with her new look. She begins dating Will (Lyriq Bent), from the salon, and befriending his daughter, Zoe (Daria Johns). Violet and Will quickly grow close, and he attends her mother's Fourth of July party. While there, he is disrespected by Paulette, who makes condescending comments about him and his career choice. He breaks it off with Violet, telling her to sort herself out.

After losing a pitch for an ad campaign with diverse women to a male colleague's idea using blonde models, Violet quits her job. At home, she dances to upbeat music while Clint, who is picking up his things is watching and appreciating her loosening up. As it has been months since the breakup, Clint is interested in Violet and apologizes, saying he never wanted her to think she wasn't beautiful. As the dog peed on Clint’s shirt, she allows him to shower. Then as she is joining him, they have sex. The next morning, Violet is preparing breakfast, but Clint insists she sits at the table, and cuts onions. He proposes with an onion ring and she says yes. Both she and her mom are excited, and Violet’s friends are told the wedding is in three months. Violet, who has stayed connected with Zoe, invites her to the engagement party.

Clint requests Violet straighten her hair to meet his parents, and Paulette helps straighten it. At the party, Violet meets Clint’s parents, feels pressured and uneasy, and goes off alone. Her heels are killing her, so she takes them off. Everyone is seated and waiting for her, so the parents look for her. Finding her, Violet says Zoe would go barefoot and knows who she is while she doesn't. Going barefoot to the pool, surrounded by tables of people, she jumps in and invites others. Zoe, Violet’s two girlfriends, and others join her. Violet’s father grabs her mother and they jump in, and make up with a kiss. Clint looks on, disappointedly.

Some days later, Violet and Will are in the conference room of an ad agency, and she is pitching Will’s plant-based hair products for women’s natural hair. After the meeting, Violet and Will walk out together, and after speaking briefly, Violet walks away confidently.

Cast 
 Sanaa Lathan as Violet Jones
 Ernie Hudson as Richard Jones
 Lyriq Bent as Will Wright
 Lynn Whitfield as Paulette Jones
 Ricky Whittle as Clint Conrad
 Camille Guaty as Wendy
 Terry Serpico as Bill
 Brittany S. Hall as Natasha
 Daria Johns as Zoe Wright
 Danielle Lyn as Alicia 
 John Salley as Tyson Edwards
 RonReaco Lee as Gerard
 Puff the Dog as Lola

Production 
The romantic comedy project Nappily Ever After was previously in development by Universal Pictures in 2003, when the studio had Patricia Cardoso to direct the film adaptation of Trisha R. Thomas' novel of same name, and the script was written by Tina Gordon Chism which was later rewritten by Lisa Loomer. Halle Berry was boarded to star in the film which had producers Berry and Marc Platt along with Vincent Cirrincione and Angela DeJoseph.

On August 15, 2017, it was announced that the film was now developing by Netflix and Sanaa Lathan was cast to play the lead role, which Haifaa al-Mansour would direct from a screenplay by Adam Brooks and Cee Marcellus.  Producers would be Platt, Tracey Bing, Jared Leboff, and Lathan. Ernie Hudson also joined the film to play Violet Jones' (Lathan) father Richard. In August 2017, Lynn Whitfield had joined the film to play Violet's mother, Paulette. In September 2017, more cast was announced which included Ricky Whittle as Clint, a doctor from London who has a long-term relationship with Violet; Lyriq Bent to play Will Wright, a hair stylist and salon owner who starts a new relationship with Violet; and Camille Guaty also joined the film to play Wendy, one of Violet's best friends. On September 11, 2017, Brittany S. Hall was cast in the film to play one of Violet's best friends.

Principal photography on the film began on August 28, 2017 in Atlanta. Lathan shaved her head for her role in the film.

Release
The film was released on September 21, 2018.

Reception
The film holds an approval rating of 67% on Rotten Tomatoes based on 15 reviews.

References

External links 
 
 

2018 films
African-American romantic comedy films
2018 romantic comedy films
Films based on romance novels
Films shot in Atlanta
Films directed by Haifaa al-Mansour
Films produced by Marc E. Platt
Films scored by Lesley Barber
English-language Netflix original films
African-American films
African-American hair
2010s English-language films
2010s American films